Amr Aly (born August 1, 1962) (Arabic: عمر علي) is an American retired soccer forward. He attended Columbia University where he won the 1984 Hermann Trophy as the college player of the year.

He was a member of the 1984 U.S. Olympic Soccer Team and earned a total 8 caps, scoring no goals between 1984 and 1985.  He was a member of the U.S. National Soccer Team 1980–1987, including the 1981 FIFA World Youth Championship in Australia.  He scored two of the U.S. team's four goals in the 1980 China Great Wall Tournament. He appeared in one match at the 1983 Pan American Games and two matches at the 1987 Pan American Games, but these are not considered full internationals.

After graduating from Columbia, Amr played indoor soccer for the New York Cosmos, LA Lazers and New York Express for its single season in 1985–1986.  He also played a single outdoor season in 1989 with the New Jersey Eagles of the American Professional Soccer League. In 1990, he played for the Brooklyn Italians in the Cosmopolitan Soccer League.  The Italians went to the 1990 U.S. Open Cup final where it fell to the A.A.C. Eagles. Aly assisted on the lone Italians goal in the 2–1 loss.

Amr was inducted into the Columbia University Athletics Hall of Fame in 2008 along with the 1983 Columbia Soccer Team that was undefeated until the NCAA Division I final game; and in 2014 in his individual capacity.

He is currently a partner in the Intellectual Property practice at the Jenner & Block law firm. Before that, he was a partner at Mayer Brown.

References

External links
 MISL stats

1962 births
Living people
American soccer players
American Soccer League (1988–89) players
Brooklyn Italians players
Columbia Lions men's soccer players
Egyptian emigrants to the United States
Naturalized citizens of the United States
Association football forwards
Footballers at the 1984 Summer Olympics
Los Angeles Lazers players
Major Indoor Soccer League (1978–1992) players
New York Cosmos (MISL) players
New York Express players
New Jersey Eagles players
Olympic soccer players of the United States
United States men's international soccer players
United States men's under-20 international soccer players
Pan American Games competitors for the United States
Footballers at the 1983 Pan American Games
Footballers at the 1987 Pan American Games
Hermann Trophy men's winners